Kuyavian Borowiaks is an ethnic subgroup of Kuyavians, who themselves are an ethnographic group of Polish people. They originate from the forest area of southern Kuyavia, located between the towns of Brdów, Przedecz, and Sompolno, within the counties of Koło and Konin, within the Greater Poland Voivodeship, Poland. They speak the Kuyavian subdialect of the Greater Poland dialect of Polish language. The group itself has inflected by nearby groups of Kashubians and Greater Poland people.

Notes

References 

Lechites
Polish people
Slavic ethnic groups
Ethnic groups in Poland
Greater Poland
Greater Poland Voivodeship
Koło County
Konin County